Un centavo de mujer is a 1958 Argentine romantic drama film directed by Román Viñoly Barreto. It stars Georges Rivière (Jorge Rivier), Elsa Daniel and Nelly Panizza. The film is about a teenage girl who has the desire to pursue a relationship with an older, drunken French actor.

Cast
Francisco Audenino 		
Ricardo Castro Ríos 			
Doris Coll
Elsa Daniel	
Mónica Linares
André Norevó
Nelly Panizza
Georges Rivière
Raúl Rossi
Mariano Vidal Molina	
Aída Villadeamigo

Gallery

References

External links
 

1958 films
1950s Spanish-language films
Films directed by Román Viñoly Barreto
1958 romantic drama films
Argentine romantic drama films
1950s Argentine films